Ng Wing Kum (born 6 May 1984) is a Hongkonger retired footballer who played as a midfielder. She is also a former futsal player, and represented Hong Kong internationally in both football and futsal.

Club career
Ng Wing Kum has played for Citizen AA in Hong Kong.

International career
Ng Wing Kum has been capped for Hong Kong at senior level in both football and futsal. In football, she represented Hong Kong at four AFC Women's Asian Cup qualification editions (2008, 2010, 2014 and 2018), three EAFF E-1 Football Championship editions (2010, 2013 and 2017), the 2012 AFC Women's Olympic Qualifying Tournament and the 2014 Asian Games.

In futsal, Ng Wing Kum played for Hong Kong at two AFC Women's Futsal Championship editions (2015 and 2018) and the 2017 Asian Indoor and Martial Arts Games.

International goals

See also
List of Hong Kong women's international footballers

References

1984 births
Living people
Hong Kong women's futsal players
Hong Kong women's footballers
Women's association football midfielders
Hong Kong women's international footballers
Footballers at the 2014 Asian Games
Asian Games competitors for Hong Kong